Adam Lewis (also known as Mr Ronz) is a BAFTA winning composer, songwriter and producer, originally from Tonyrefail, South Wales, but now based in London.

As well as scoring TV shows, films and theatre productions Lewis wrote the main theme from controversial brit-flick Kidulthood. In 2008 he appeared in Kneehigh Theatre's critically acclaimed version of Brief Encounter in London's West End. Lewis collaborated with Andy Price on all 8 seasons of Law & Order: UK for ITV. His provided music and soundscapes for The Well, a four-part horror series for the BBC by controversial author Melvin Burgess. He also scored feature 4.3.2.1. with Barnaby Robson.

In 2010 Lewis was announced as the composer on the 1st series of the BBC Wales production Baker Boys starring Eve Myles. In 2011 he began work on the second series of Baker Boys for BBC Wales.

On 30 September 2012 Adam won BAFTA Cymru award for his original music on series 1 of Baker Boys for BBC Wales.

In 2016, he provided additional music for E4's The Aliens

From 2017 to 2020 he provided additional music for series 21-23 of Silent Witness alongside composer Andy Price

Adam is currently one half of duo Days Are Done with singer/songwriter Emmy-Lou Kay.

References

External links
Adam Lewis Music Official Website

Days Are Done official Website
 BAFTA Cymru 2012 winners list

Living people
British film score composers
British male film score composers
Year of birth missing (living people)